Rolf Beilschmidt (born 8 August 1953, in Jena) is a retired East German high jumper.

Beilschmidt represented the sports club SC Motor Jena, and became East German champion in 1974, 1975, 1976, 1977, 1978, 1979 and 1981.

Beilschmidt's personal best high jump was 2.31 metres, achieved in August 1977 in Helsinki.

Beilschmidt shares the decathlon world record in high jump with Christian Schenk at 2.27 m.

Achievements

References

1953 births
Living people
Sportspeople from Jena
People from Bezirk Gera
East German male high jumpers
Olympic athletes of East Germany
Athletes (track and field) at the 1976 Summer Olympics
European Athletics Championships medalists
Universiade medalists in athletics (track and field)
People of the Stasi
Universiade silver medalists for East Germany
Medalists at the 1979 Summer Universiade